Dead Man's Evidence is a 1962 British crime thriller film directed by Francis Searle. Its plot follows a British spy sent to Ireland to investigate the death of a former colleague who defected and who has been found dead on a beach.

Cast
 Conrad Phillips as David Baxter
 Jane Griffiths as Linda Howard
 Veronica Hurst as Gay Clifford
 Ryck Rydon as Mark Fallon
 Godfrey Quigley as Superintendent O'Brien
 Bruce Seton as Colonel James Somerset
 Harry Webster as Andy
 Maureen Halligan as Mrs Mac
 Laurie Leigh as Pat
 Tommy Duggan as Mr Casey
 Alex Macintosh as Paul Kay
 Frank Sieman as Barman
 Middleton Woods as Kim
 Fergus O'Kelly as Night Porter
 Gordon Waine as Hotel Waiter
 Sonia Fox as Hotel Receptionist

References

External links

1962 films
British crime thriller films
Films set in Ireland
Films directed by Francis Searle
Films scored by Ken Thorne
Films shot at MGM-British Studios
1960s English-language films
1960s British films